Waites is a surname. Notable people with the surname include:

Addie Waites Hunton (1866–1943), American activist
Aline Waites, English actress
Brian Waites, English golfer
Cole Waites (born 1998), American baseball player
George Waites (1938–2000), English footballer
Harry Waites, English football coach
Keisha Waites (born 1972), American politician
Luigi Waites (1927–2010), American jazz drummer and vibraphonist
Richard Waites (1951–2016), American psychologist
Scott Waites (born 1977), English darts player
Thomas G. Waites (born 1955), American actor